Francesca is a 2009 Romanian drama film directed by Bobby Păunescu and starring Monica Bîrlădeanu and Dorian Boguță.

Cast 
 Monica Bîrlădeanu - Francesca 
 Dorian Boguță - Mita 
 Luminița Gheorghiu - Ana
 Teodor Corban - Ion
 Dana Dogaru - Doamna Elena
 Doru Ana - Nasul
  - Pandele
 Mihai Dorobantu - Remulus
 Gabriel Spahiu - Sofer autocar
  - Zana

References

External links 

2009 drama films
2009 films
Romanian drama films
2000s Romanian-language films